William Albert Atkinson (1876-1948) was a provincial politician from Alberta, Canada. He served as a member of the Legislative Assembly of Alberta from 1930 to 1935 sitting with the Conservative caucus in opposition.

Political career
Atkinson ran for a seat to the Alberta Legislature in the 1930 Alberta general election in the Edmonton electoral district. Although not a winning candidate in the first count, the election used STV so he picked up enough later votes to take the last open seat to be elected.

Atkinson ran for a second term in office. He came in eleventh place on the first vote count and was unable to win enough vote transfers to take a seat this time.

References

External links
Legislative Assembly of Alberta Members Listing

Progressive Conservative Association of Alberta MLAs
1876 births
1948 deaths